Muzio Attendolo Sforza (28 May 1369 – 4 January 1424), was an Italian condottiero. Founder of the Sforza dynasty, he led a Bolognese-Florentine army at the Battle of Casalecchio.

He was the father of Francesco Sforza, who ruled Milan for 16 years.

Biography
He was born as Giacomo or Jacopo Attendolo in Cotignola (Romagna) to a rich family of rural nobility, son of Giovanni Attendolo (d. 1385/1386) and Elisa, perhaps daughter of Ugolino Petraccini. Muzzo or Muzio was the short form of the nickname of Giacomuzzo, which was the name of his paternal grandfather.  He had eight known siblings: Bosio (d. 1411), Margherita (by her first mariage de’ Ravignani and by her second Countess of Morcone), Francesco (d. 1412), Bartolo (d. 1412), Giorgio, Matteo (killed in 1388), Tonduzzo (killed with his brother in 1388) and Maria (d. 1412; by marriage Marchioness Pallavicino).

According to tradition, young Giacomo was plowing a field when a platoon of mercenaries led by Boldrino da Panicale passed nearby in search of recruits. He then  stole one of his father's horses and followed the soldiers to follow the same career.

Later, together with his brothers Bosio, Francesco and Bartolo and two cousins, he joined the company of Alberico da Barbiano, who nicknamed him "Sforza" ("Strong") for his staunchness and his abilities to suddenly reverse the fortunes of battles. In 1398 he was at the service of Perugia against the Milanese troops of Gian Galeazzo Visconti, to whom Muzio soon switched his loyalty following the typical behavior of mercenary chieftains of the time. Later he fought for Florence against Visconti but in 1402, at the battle of Casalecchio, was defeated by his former master Alberico da Barbiano. In 1406 he captured Pisa and was subsequently hired by Niccolò III d'Este of Ferrara, who was being menaced by Ottobono Terzi of Parma.

King Ladislaus of Naples named him Gran Connestabile of his kingdom. Sforza's military qualities were mostly needed against Florence and the Pope. He remained for the rest of his life in the Kingdom of Naples, after the King's death (1414), at the service of queen Joan II. However, he attracted the jealousy of Joan's favorite, Pandolfello Alopo, who had him arrested and imprisoned. However, when Sforza's troops intervened, Alopo freed him and Joan gave him the fiefdoms of Benevento and Manfredonia. On this occasion Sforza married Caterina Alopo, Pandolfello's sister. A few months later Sforza was again arrested after a quarrel with James of Bourbon. He was freed only in 1416, after James' fall from power, and Joan gave him back the title of Conestabile.

In 1417 Sforza was sent by Joan to help the pope against Braccio da Montone, together with his son Francesco. Later he returned briefly to Naples, but here he was opposed by Giovanni (Sergianni) Caracciolo, Joan's new lover. In the following, confused, events that led to the arrival of Louis III of Anjou in Naples in opposition to Alfonso V of Aragon, Sforza helped Joan and Sergianni to flee to Aversa.

In 1423, the city of L'Aquila rebelled against Braccio da Montone and he was sent to support it. In an attempt to save one of his pages during the fording of the Pescara River, Sforza drowned and his body was swept away by the waters.

Family
Sforza had sixteen known children born from three marriages and two mistresses:

In 1409, Sforza married firstly with Antonia (d. 1411), widow of Francesco Casali, Lord of Cortona and daughter of Francesco Salimbeni, Patrician of Siena and Lord of Chiusi, Radicofani, Bagno Vignoni, Carsoli and Sarteano. They had one son:
Bosio (1410 - 1476), Count of Cotignola (1424), Lord of Castell’Arquato and Sovereign Count of Santa Fiora by virtue of his marriage (1439) with Cecilia Aldobrandeschi, Countess of Santa Fiora and Pitigliano.

On 16 June 1413, Sforza married secondly with Caterina (also named Catella; d. 1418 in childbirth), a sister of Pandolfello Piscopo "Alopo", Grand Chamberlain of the Kingdom of Naples and lover of Queen Joanna II. They had three children:
Leonardo (1415 - 1438).
Pietro (1417 - 1442), Bishop of Ascoli Piceno since 1438.
Giovanna (born and died 1418).

In 1421, Sforza married thirdly with Maria (d. 1440), daughter of Giacomo da Marzano, 1st Duke of Sessa, and Sovereign Countess of Celano after inherited from her first husband Nicola de Berardi. They had two children:
Bartolomeo (1420 - 1435), Count of Celano (1430).
Carlo (15 June 1423 - 12 September 1457), later renamed Gabriele in his ordination, Archbishop of Milan since 1445.

With his mistress Tamira di Cagli, Sforza had two children:
Mansueto (ca. 1400 - 1467), Abbot of San Lorenzo of Cremona (1425).
Onestina (1402 - 1422), a Benedictine nun.

With his mistress Lucia Terzani da Marsciano (or Lucia da Torsano according to other sources; d. 1461), Sforza had eight children:
Francesco (23 July 1401 - 8 March 1466), Duke of Milan in 1450. 
Elisa (1402 - 1476), married in 1417 to Leonello of Sanseverino, Count of Cajazzo.
Alberico (1403 - 1423).
Antonia (16 January 1404 - 1471), married firstly in 1417 to Ardizzone da Carrara, Lord of Feltre, and secondly in 1442 to Manfredo da Barbiano.
Leone (May 1406 - September 1440), condottiero; married in 1435 to Marsobilia Trinci di Foligno (d. 1485). No issue.
Giovanni (1407 - December 1451), condottiero; married in 1419 to Lavinia Lavello di Toscanella. No issue.
Gregorio (29 October 1409 - April 1473), changed his name to Alessandro in honour to Pope Alexander V; Lord of Pesaro (1445).
Orsola (1411 - 1460), a Clarisse nun.

See also
Condottieri
Joan II of Naples
Louis III of Anjou
Micheletto Attendolo
Francesco Sforza
Angelo Tartaglia

Other
The Italian Regia Marina launched a cruiser called Muzio Attendolo in 1935. See also Condottieri class cruiser.

Notes

Sources
Paolo Giovio, Vita di Muzio Attendolo
Caterina Santoro, Gli Sforza, 1968

Claudio Rendina, I Capitani di ventura, 1994

1369 births
1424 deaths
People from the Province of Ravenna
14th-century condottieri
Muzio
15th-century condottieri
Deaths by drowning